Port Credit GO Station is a GO Transit train and bus station in Mississauga, Ontario Canada. Located in the Port Credit neighbourhood, it is a stop on the Lakeshore West line train service. Port Credit GO has been identified by Metrolinx as a transportation mobility hub, where different forms of transportation come together, serving as the origin, destination or transfer point for a significant amount of trips. It also is a concentrated point of employment, housing, and recreation, making them places of significant economic development and activity where office buildings, hospitals, educational institutions, government service and information centres, shopping malls and restaurants can be located. The under-construction Hurontario LRT will serve the station.

History

The Great Western Railway opened the first railway station in Port Credit in 1855 at Stavebank Road, just west of the current GO Transit facility. That station burned to the ground and was replaced by Canadian National closer to the location of the current station, which opened in 1967 when GO Train service began on the Lakeshore West line. The Great Western Railway was purchased in 1882 by the Grand Trunk Railway, which was absorbed into the Canadian National Railway in 1920.

MiWay bus service
The station is served by MiWay (formerly Mississauga Transit) routes:
2 Hurontario
8 Cawthra
14 Lorne Park to Clarkson GO Station
14A Lorne Park to Winston Churchill
23 Lakeshore

References

External links

 
Port Credit Mobility Hub, Master Plan Study
 C.N.Rys. Ontario Stations: Port Credit

GO Transit railway stations
Railway stations in Mississauga
Railway stations in Canada opened in 1967
1967 establishments in Ontario
Hurontario LRT